The Convention on Child Protection may refer to:
Hague Convention on Parental Responsibility and Protection of Children
Council of Europe Convention on the Protection of Children against Sexual Exploitation and Sexual Abuse